"You Are Alive" is a song by German trance music group Fragma featuring vocals from German singer-songwriter Damae. It was released on 7 May 2001 as the fourth and final single from their debut album, Toca. The single peaked at number four on the UK Singles Chart in May 2001 and charted within the top 20 in Austria, Denmark, Ireland, Norway, Romania, and Spain. In the United States, the song reached number 17 on the Billboard Dance Club Songs chart.

Track listings

German CD single
 "You Are Alive" (radio edit) – 3:36
 "You Are Alive" (Blank & Jones remix) – 7:56
 "You Are Alive" (extended version) – 6:00
 "You Are Alive" (Warp Brothers remix) – 7:23
 "You Are Alive" (Praha remix) – 8:15
 "You Are Alive" (dub version)	– 5:15

UK CD1
 "You Are Alive" (radio edit) – 3:36
 "You Are Alive" (extended version) – 6:00
 "Toca Megamix" – 8:07
 "You Are Alive" (enhanced video)

UK CD2
 "You Are Alive" (radio edit) – 3:36
 "You Are Alive" (Warp Brothers remix) – 7:23
 "You Are Alive" (Blank & Jones remix) – 7:56

US 12-inch single
A1. "You Are Alive" (extended version) – 6:00
A2. "You Are Alive" (Warp Brothers remix) – 7:23
B1. "You Are Alive" (Blank & Jones remix) – 7:56
B2. "You Are Alive" (dub version)	– 5:15

Australian CD single
 "You Are Alive" (radio edit) – 3:36
 "You Are Alive" (Warp Brothers remix) – 7:23
 "You Are Alive" (extended version) – 6:00
 "You Are Alive" (Blank & Jones remix) – 7:56
 "You Are Alive" (Praha remix) – 8:15
 "You Are Alive" (dub version)	– 5:15

Charts

Weekly charts

Year-end charts

Release history

References

2001 singles
2001 songs
Positiva Records singles
Songs written by Ramon Zenker